Dial 100 refers to:
Dial 100 (1982 film), by S. Ramanathan
Dial 100 (2001 film), starring Kader Khan
Dial 100 (TV series), a television series aired on Indian satellite channel SABe TV
Dial 100 (2021 film), an Indian Hindi-language thriller drama film